Cretaceous Research is a bimonthly peer-reviewed scientific journal published by Elsevier. The journal focuses on topics dealing with the Cretaceous period and the Cretaceous–Paleogene boundary.

Abstracting and indexing 
The journal is abstracted and indexed in Scopus and the Web of Science. According to the Journal Citation Reports, the journal has a 2020 impact factor of 2.176.

References

External links 
 

Elsevier academic journals
Paleontology journals
Publications established in 1980
English-language journals
Bimonthly journals